Tounsi  is a surname. Notable people with the surname include:

Abderrahim Tounsi (1936–2023), Moroccan comedian
Ali Tounsi (1937–2010), French-born Algerian police chief
Mahmoud Tounsi (1944–2001), Tunisian author and painter